"This Time" is a song written and recorded by American country music artist Waylon Jennings. It is the title track from the album This Time and was released in April 1974 as the album's first single. The song reached No. 1 on the Billboard Hot Country Singles chart in June 1974 and was his first of fourteen country No. 1 hits.

Chart performance

References

1974 singles
1974 songs
Waylon Jennings songs
Songs written by Waylon Jennings
RCA Records singles